Hori is a genre of semi-classical singing, popular in Uttar Pradesh and Bihar. It can be adorned with a Bhairavi, Thumri etc.

It comes in the series of season songs, like Chaiti, Sawani and Kajari, and is traditionally sung in the villages and towns of Uttar Pradesh: around Banaras, Mirzapur, Mathura, Allahabad and the Bhojpur regions of Bihar.It is also called Dhamar, which is sung with Dhamar taal . Songs of Hori/ Dhamar are related to Radha-Krishna Leela in the festival of Holi.

References

Indian styles of music
Hindustani music genres
Music of Uttar Pradesh
Music of Bihar
Hindustani music terminology